Mark James Dugdale (born December 25, 1974) is an American IFBB professional bodybuilder. He lives in Woodinville, Washington.
 
His first competition in bodybuilding was in 1997 when he competed in the NPC (National Physique Committee) Emerald Cup. He placed 3rd in the middleweight class. 
His first Arnold Classic was in 2005, where he placed 9th. Later that year he competed in the Ironman Pro Invitational and the San Francisco Pro Invitational, placing 8th and 6th, respectively. He recently portrayed Achilles on the album cover for Back Breaker, the third album from the Tennessee Thrash metal band The Showdown.

Profile
Family: Christina Dugdale; 3 children (Madison Dugdale 
Off-Season Weight: 240 lb.
Competition Weight: 212 lb.
Training location: Gold's Gym, Kirkland, Washington
Training partner: Christina Dugdale

Contest history
1997 NPC Emerald Cup, Middleweight, 3rd
1998 NPC USA Championships, Middleweight, 12th
1999 NPC Nationals, Middleweight, 6th
2001 NPC Nationals, Light-Heavyweight, 9th
2003 NPC Los Angeles Championships, Light-Heavyweight, 1st and Overall
2003 NPC USA Championships, Light-Heavyweight, 3rd
2004 NPC USA Championships, Light-HeavyWeight, 1st and Overall
2005 Arnold Classic, 9th
2005 Ironman Pro Invitational, 8th
2005 San Francisco Pro Invitational, 6th
2006 Ironman Pro Invitational, 5th
2007 Ironman Pro Invitational, 2nd
2007 Arnold Classic, 11th
2008 IFBB Tampa Bay Pro, 13th
2008 IFBB Europa, 9th
2009 IFBB Iron Man Pro, 8th	
2009 IFBB Pittsburgh Pro, 2nd
2009 IFBB New York Pro, 2nd
2009 IFBB Olympia, 4th
2009 IFBB Sacramento 6th
2010 IFBB John Simmons, 4th
2011 IFBB Pro Bodybuilding Weekly Championships, 4th 
2012 IFBB FLEX Pro, 7th
2012 IFBB Desert Muscle Classic, 2nd
2013 IFBB New York Pro, 3rd
2013 IFBB Toronto Pro Supershow, 2nd
2013 IFBB Olympia Weekend, 10th
2013 IFBB Europa Phoenix, 2nd
2014 IFBB Europa Phoenix, 2nd
2014 IFBB Olympia Weekend, 12th
2014 IFBB Bodypower Pro, 3rd
2014 IFBB Toronto Pro, 2nd
2014 IFBB Europa Phoenix, 2nd
2015 IFBB Europa Phoenix, 5th
2016 IFBB Toronto Pro, Men's 212, 4th
2016 IFBB Arctic Pro, Men's 212, 1st
2016 IFBB Vancouver Pro, Men's 212, 1st
2016 IFBB Chicago Pro, Men's 212, 1st

See also
List of male professional bodybuilders
List of female professional bodybuilders
 Mr. Olympia
 Arnold Classic

References

4. http://contest.bodybuilding.com/bio/25

External links
Official website

1974 births
Living people
People from Woodinville, Washington
Professional bodybuilders
Place of birth missing (living people)